In 1923, Ohio renumbered almost all of its state highways in order to simplify the system.

References

 Renumbering 1923
Ohio State Highway Renumbering, 1923
State Highway Renumbering, 1923
History of Ohio
Highway renumbering in the United States